Alexander Alexeyevich Makarov,  (born 1966) is a Russian physicist who led the team that developed the Orbitrap, a type of mass spectrometer, and received the 2008 American Society for Mass Spectrometry Distinguished Contribution in Mass Spectrometry Award for this development. In November 2013 he was appointed to Professor by Special Appointment of High Resolution Mass Spectrometry at the Department of Chemistry and the Bijvoet Center for Biomolecular Research of Utrecht University in the Netherlands.

As of 2016, he is Director of Global Research for Life Sciences Mass Spectrometry at Thermo Fisher Scientific.

Early life and education 
 1989 Moscow Engineering Physics Institute - M.S. Molecular Physics
 1993 Moscow Engineering Physics Institute - Ph.D. Physics and Mathematics
 1994-1996 Warwick University - Postdoctoral Appointment

Awards 
 2008 ASMS Distinguished Contribution in Mass Spectrometry Award
 2012 Thomson Medal Award
 2020 Fellow of the Royal Society

References

Living people
Russian physicists
21st-century Russian inventors
Mass spectrometrists
1966 births
Thomson Medal recipients